Abdominal angina is abdominal pain after eating that occurs in individuals with ongoing poor blood supply to their small intestines known as chronic mesenteric ischemia. Although the term angina alone usually denotes angina pectoris (a type of chest pain due to obstruction of the coronary artery), angina by itself can also mean "any spasmodic, choking, or suffocative pain", with an anatomic adjective defining its focus; so, in this case, spasmodic pain in the abdomen. Stedman's Medical Dictionary Online defines abdominal angina as "intermittent abdominal pain, frequently occurring at a fixed time after eating, caused by inadequacy of the mesenteric circulation resulting from arteriosclerosis or other arterial disease. Synonym: intestinal angina."

Signs and symptoms 
 Hallmark of condition: Intermittent abdominal pain a fixed period of time after eating.
 Physical examination: The abdomen typically is scaphoid and soft, even during an episode of pain. Patients present with stigmata of weight loss and signs of peripheral vascular disease, particularly aortoiliac occlusive disease, may be present.

Causes

Pathophysiology 
The pathophysiology is similar to that seen in angina pectoris and intermittent claudication. The most common cause of abdominal angina is atherosclerotic vascular disease, where the occlusive process commonly involves the ostia and the proximal few centimeters of the mesenteric vessels.
It can be associated with:
 carcinoid
 aortic coarctation
 antiphospholipid syndrome

Treatment
Stents have been used in the treatment of abdominal angina.

See also 
 Abdominal pain
 Ischemic colitis

References

External links 

Pain
Abdominal pain